Kerry Thomas Taylor (born January 25, 1971) is an American former Major League Baseball pitcher. Taylor grew up in Roseau, Minnesota. He batted and threw right-handed.

External links

1971 births
Living people
Baseball players from Minnesota
San Diego Padres players
Atlantic City Surf players
Elizabethton Twins players
Gulf Coast Twins players
Kenosha Twins players
Las Vegas Stars (baseball) players
Mobile BayBears players
Toledo Mud Hens players
Syracuse SkyChiefs players
People from Bemidji, Minnesota